Boris Sambolec (born 25 August 1980) is a Slovenian football defender who plays for Zavrč in the Slovenian PrvaLiga.

References

External links
PrvaLiga profile 

1980 births
Living people
People from Ptuj
Slovenian footballers
Association football defenders
NK Aluminij players
NK Zavrč players
Slovenian PrvaLiga players
Slovenian expatriate footballers
Slovenian expatriate sportspeople in Austria
Expatriate footballers in Austria
SV Allerheiligen players